Michael C. Maronna (born September 27, 1977) is an American actor, who has appeared in several television programs and films. He is best known for his roles as "Big Pete" Wrigley on the television series The Adventures of Pete & Pete and as Jeff McCallister in the movie Home Alone and its sequel, Home Alone 2: Lost in New York.

Early life and education
Maronna was born in Brooklyn, New York, to a firefighter father and a guidance counselor mother. He is of one half Italian, three-eighths Irish, and one-eighth Dutch descent. He was the first grandchild in a big family, which included one younger brother and sister. As a teenager, he went to Hunter College High School in New York City, before attending Purchase College of the State University of New York, where he studied documentary/nonfiction filmmaking.

Career

Maronna appeared in his first commercial at a very young age, and it was for a Scott Paper advertisement. He played older Pete Wrigley in the television show The Adventures of Pete & Pete on Nickelodeon (from 1989 to 1996), as well as the character of Jeff McCallister in the movie Home Alone (1990) and its sequel, Home Alone 2: Lost in New York (1992). In the first one he says the line "Kevin, you are such a disease!", which became widely popular. He also portrayed a teenage killer in an episode of Law & Order. In the 2000s, Maronna appeared in the movies Slackers and 40 Days and 40 Nights.

Maronna also appeared in the music video for the 2007 Nada Surf song Whose Authority. 

Maronna was in a widely seen series of 1999 ads for TD Ameritrade as Stuart, a slacker employee of a clueless boss whom he helps get on the internet with over-the-top zealousness. Maronna reprised the role in a comedy reel with Bill Clinton, which was shown at Clinton's final appearance as the President of the United States at the 2000 White House Correspondents' Association dinner.

Maronna's last acting credits were in 2013, and since then he has worked as an electrician on films and television in New York. His credits include roles in Sex and The City and Be Kind Rewind. He also appeared in the music videos for Whose Authority and All My Friends, by the bands Nada Surf and The XYZ Affair, respectively.

Since 2013, Maronna co-hosts the podcast The Adventures of Danny and Mike with his Adventures of Pete and Pete co-star Danny Tamberelli.

Personal life
Maronna married prior to 2013 and has a son.

Filmography

References

External links

Michael Maronna on Twitter

1977 births
20th-century American male actors
21st-century American male actors
American electricians
American male child actors
American male film actors
American male television actors
American people of Dutch descent
American people of Irish descent
American people of Italian descent
American podcasters
Hunter College High School alumni
Living people
Male actors from New York City
People from Brooklyn
State University of New York at Purchase alumni